Sir William Jephson (c. 1565 – 16 November 1615), of Froyle, Hampshire, was an English Member of Parliament.

He was a Member (MP) of the Parliament of England for Hampshire in 1604. It was alleged that he was blind.

References

1560s births
1615 deaths
17th-century English politicians
People from Froyle
English MPs 1604–1611